Lynx FC is a football club from the British Overseas Territory of Gibraltar. They play in the Gibraltar Football Association's Premier Division. The club colours are yellow and black.

History
The club was formed in 2007 and has been managed by Albert Parody for the majority of its history, making him the country's longest serving manager. After winning the Gibraltar Second Division in 2012, thus earning promotion to the Gibraltar Premier Division, the club have established themselves as a top flight team. Lynx recorded an impressive 4th place in the 2013–14 season, Gibraltar's first season with an 8 team league as members of UEFA. Since then, the club have settled into mid-table.

In 2015 they appointed former national team coach Allen Bula as a sporting director, as well as becoming a feeder club to Slovakian side MFK Košice, for whom Bula was an academy coach before managing Gibraltar. Another mid-table finish followed, however, squad changes over the summer left them struggling in the bottom of the table for the first half of the 2016-17 season leaving question marks over Albert Parody's future at the club. Changes in January 2017 saw the signing of key players including goalkeeper Dany Fernandes and defender Charlie Mitchell, and an upturn in form saw a comfortable 6th-place finish at the end of the season. On 2 June Albert Parody, the longest serving manager in the Gibraltar Premier Division, resigned and was replaced by Allen Bula. However, after 4 games and 4 defeats without any goals scored, it was reported that Bula had parted ways with the club on 27 October.

Domestic history

Players

Current squad

Intermediate team
The following players are registered for the Gibraltar Intermediate League. Players from the first team may also appear for this team.

Notes

External links 

UEFA profile

Football clubs in Gibraltar
Gibraltar National League clubs
Association football clubs established in 2007
2007 establishments in Gibraltar